Kasakan (also Romanized as Kasakān and Kāskān; also known as Qazqān) is a village in Deris Rural District, in the Central District of Kazerun County, Fars Province, Iran. At the 2006 census, its population was 750, in 169 families.

References 

Populated places in Kazerun County